Rimac Automobili (\'Ri-mats\) is a Croatian car manufacturer headquartered in Sveta Nedelja, Croatia, that develops and produces electric sports cars, drivetrains and battery systems. The company was founded in 2009 by Mate Rimac. Rimac Automobili's first model, the Concept One, was the world's fastest production electric vehicle. While manufacturing and marketing high-performance vehicles under its own brand, Rimac also develops and produces battery packs, drivetrain systems, and vehicles for other companies. The Applus+ IDIADA Volar-E is an example of a product developed for another company. During the 88th Geneva International Motor Show in March 2018, the company unveiled its second model, the Rimac Nevera.

History

The groundwork for the company was laid in 2007 as a hobby garage activity of Mate Rimac.  Working on his own, he converted his BMW 3 Series (E30) to incorporate an electric powertrain and subsequently gained attention from the press and investors. A significant part of the early financing came from angel investors and the sale of proprietary patents.

Rimac Automobili was founded in 2009 in Sveta Nedelja, near Zagreb, Croatia, where suitable facilities were rented. When he was 19 years old, Mate Rimac began converting an E30-M3 which served as his first test mule: "I owned an old BMW E30 (MY 1984) which I used for drift and circuit races. At one of these races, the gas engine suddenly blew up. At that moment, I decided to try building an EV. After one year or so the car was able to drive but I was not yet satisfied with the result. It was heavy, not very powerful and the range was very limited. For this reason, I started to gather a team of experts to develop our own components since I believed that the electric propulsion could give much more compared to what was available on the market. At that time, I already had a very clear vision of my ultimate goal. Today, hard work is making my dream come true."

In 2018, Volkswagen Group subsidiary Porsche Engineering Group GmbH acquired a 10% stake in Rimac to form a development partnership, as part of its electrification process. Mate Rimac commented: "This partnership now is an important step for Rimac on our way to become a component and system supplier of choice for the industry in electrification, connectivity and the exciting field of Advanced Driver Assistance Systems". Hyundai Motor Company and Kia Motors jointly invested  million in 2019 and announced plans "to collaborate on the development of high-performance electric vehicles." In 2020, Rimac recommended Infinum, the largest Balkan software and design company, to Porsche that led to creation of the a joint venture Porsche Digital Croatia with an investment of  million.

In July 2021, VW Group's Porsche and Rimac announced that they have agreed to create a joint venture that will incorporate Volkswagen's high-performance Bugatti brand as well as Rimac Automobili. The new venture will be called Bugatti Rimac. Parent company Rimac Group will have a 55% stake in the joint venture, while Porsche will hold a 45% stake in the company. in June of that year, Porsche stated it was one of the participants in a new  million round of fundraising. 

Rimac Technology is 100% owned by the Rimac Group. Rimac Technology develops vehicle systems and technologies for many global OEMs.

Models

e-M3
Rimac's first car was a converted 1984 BMW M3 called the Rimac e-M3, nicknamed the "Green Monster" by the designers working for the company. With a 0–100 km/h (62 mph) acceleration achieved in 3.3 seconds, it earned the title of fastest-accelerating electric vehicle in Category A, Group VIII (electric vehicle) and Class 3 (over 1,000 kg) in 2011. Five development updates pushed the e-M3 to become the officially fastest-accelerating electric vehicle according to strict FIA rules.

 Records set on 17 April 2011:
 1/8 mile: 7.549 s
 1/4 mile: 11.808 s
 1/2 km: 13.714 s*
 1 km: 23.260 s*
 1 mile: 35.347 s*

*Records subject to official FIA approval (pending)

The original BMW went through five stages of reinvention and now, says Rimac, "it got faster, lighter and more reliable each time." At that point, once he realised how little of the original car remained, he decided to build a new and faster car from scratch.

Ampster 
The Ampster was a one-off electric-powered Opel Speedster.

Concept One

The Concept One is an all-electric battery-powered sports car. The car was first unveiled in 2011 at the Frankfurt Motor Show, when some parts were contracted to other companies. The production version was introduced in 2016.

A production of 88 units was initially stated, which was later limited to 8 units, all of which were sold. The first car was for Spanish company Applus+ IDIADA, called the Volar-e. The second buyer is Paul Runge,  one of the shareholders of Rimac automobili.

The battery cells are supplied by Sony, with wheels being supplied by HRE Performance wheels, developed in collaboration with Rimac.

Almost all of the materials are produced in-house, and none of the critical components used in the vehicle are off-the-shelf. The design team includes former designers from Pininfarina and Magna Steyr; the exterior of the car was designed by Croatian designer Adriano Mudri.

Rimac's goal is to make the best electric sports car in the market. For this reason, the whole car is developed around the powertrain and battery-pack. Gear changes or clutches are not needed due to the electric drivetrain. The batteries are located under the floor of the vehicle together with the other heavy propulsion components, which leads to a low center of gravity and better handling. Rimac made eight Concept Ones.

Concept S

The Concept S is a lighter, more powerful and more aerodynamic, track-oriented update of the Concept One.

At the 2017 Geneva Motor Show the company announced the establishment of official dealerships of its brand in Europe, North America and the Middle East, with dealers Manhattan Motorcars, PACE Germany and Al Zarooni Group.

Nevera

The successor to the Concept One, named Nevera (renamed from Concept Two, styled as C_Two), was unveiled at the March 2018 Geneva Motor Show. The car has an entirely new design with butterfly doors and various power upgrades.

The car incorporates a fully independent torque vectoring system (R-AWTV) to improve handling and also includes many high-tech features such as a facial recognition system that would unlock the ignition only for the owner and adjust the car's settings according to the owner's mood. The car has a high-speed "drift mode", with an intelligent traction control system keeping the car under control. The Nevera will have Level 4 self-driving capability, according to Mate Rimac; it has eight cameras, a LIDAR, six radars, and twelve ultrasonic sensors. The production of the vehicle will be limited to 150 units.

Rimac debuted the Nevera California edition at the August 2018 Pebble Beach Concours d'Elegance. It comes in a one-off shade of blue, with new wheel design, and is supplied with six liters of champagne and two flutes in the boot of the car.

Component manufacturing
Rimac Technology produces battery systems for Aston Martin's new sports car, the Valkyrie. The company also produces battery systems for Koenigsegg (specifically for the Regera), Jaguar E‑type Zero concept car and SEAT Cupra e-Racer concept car. In 2018, it entered a technical partnership with Automobili Pininfarina, whose first car, the Battista, is said to be based on the same architecture and uses the same powertrain as the Nevera.

Rimac is also involved in the production of drivetrains and other components for race car drivers, such as Nobuhiro Tajima, with whom it debuted with the joint all-electric car "Tajima Rimac E-Runner Concept_One" at the 2015 Pikes Peak International Hill Climb. The car finished the race in second position, ahead of all internal combustion engine cars.

Other projects
In 2014, it was announced that Rimac Automobili is building the first fast electric yacht in the world.

In 2015, Mate Rimac said they made a driverless car, which would mean that the car has fifth-level autonomous driving. He also said that they are making personal watercraft (hovercraft). They are making 300 of them in 2015, and the following year would make over 1000. They are testing them in a lake near Sveta Nedelja. In the same interview he said they were working on a project that will require an airfield, and on a flying car.

See also
NIO EP9
RAESR
Mercedes-Benz EQ A
Aspark Owl
Volkswagen I.D. R

References

External links

 
Battery electric vehicle manufacturers
Sports car manufacturers
Luxury motor vehicle manufacturers
Vehicle manufacturing companies established in 2009
Croatian brands
Croatian companies established in 2009
Zagreb County
Car manufacturers of Croatia